The Last of Us: American Dreams is a four-issue comic book series based on the video game The Last of Us. It was written by The Last of Us creative director Neil Druckmann and cartoonist Faith Erin Hicks, with illustrations by Hicks and coloring by Rachelle Rosenberg. The series was published by Dark Horse Comics between April and July 2013, and a collected edition was published in October 2013.

Like the game, the comic is set in a post-apocalyptic United States, overrun by zombie-like creatures infected by a mutated strain of the Cordyceps fungus. The comics serve as a prequel to the game, chronicling the journey of the young Ellie and her meeting with another young survivor, Riley Abel. Druckmann chose Ellie as the focus of the comic due to the uniqueness of her birth and upbringing in the post-apocalyptic world. Hicks joined the project after discovering Ellie's role in the game, considering her an unusual character to include in a survival horror game. The comic's art style is different than the game art—a choice from Hicks to give the comic a unique feel and identity.

The series received generally positive reviews. Critics particularly praised Druckmann's writing and character development, as well as the simplicity of Hicks' illustrations. The series was also a commercial success, with some issues requiring reprinting due to high demand.

Publication history 

Dark Horse Comics approached creative director Neil Druckmann, who was working on The Last of Us, to produce a tie-in comic book series for the game. Druckmann was initially wary of the idea, but eventually agreed when he realized Dark Horse "didn't want to do something tangential" with the opportunity of expanding their characters and universe beyond the game. Work on the comic began during the game's development, which allowed the stories of the two projects to integrate, and influence each other. Druckmann requested webcomic artist Faith Erin Hicks as a collaborator on the project, after reading her comic Friends with Boys (2012) and appreciating "how personal it felt". He also felt that Hicks could capture the "gritty" feel of the game. Hicks then sent some concept art to Dark Horse as a pitch for the job; they accepted, and she became officially involved with the project. Hicks was drawn to the project after reading about the character of Ellie in the game's script; she considered Ellie an unusual character to include in a survival horror game, calling her a "tough teenage girl who wasn't sexualized, and who seemed very much the equal of her male counterpart". Hicks was given access to various gameplay sequences and the game's script during development, to allow her to better understand the story. She was also given videos of the actors performing on set, which was helpful when illustrating the characters. "I get a look at these characters and I see them interacting as human beings, not just as concept art," said Hicks.

Ellie's backstory was originally intended to fit as a gameplay sequence within The Last of Us, but this was ultimately scrapped. When Dark Horse approached Naughty Dog with the idea of a comic book, Druckmann had the opportunity to tell the story. Druckmann found that Ellie was the ideal main character for the comic due to her birth and upbringing; while characters like Joel mostly lived in the world before the outbreak, Ellie is unaware of life prior to the outbreak. This created an interesting idea for Druckmann, who became intrigued with discovering the effects of everyday actions in a post-apocalyptic world. Hicks enjoyed writing American Dreams, particularly due to the humor featured in the comic. Druckmann allowed Hicks to design the character of Riley, including her physical appearance, characteristics, and most of her dialogue. "It felt like a good way to split it, where [Hicks] would own Riley and I would own Ellie," said Druckmann. When creating the comic's art style, Hicks avoided replicating the game art, instead opting to "draw it in [her] own style and to the best of [her] ability". She felt that the art style is slightly "cartoony", which is partially due to Ellie's young age. "If [the comic] was hyper-realistic and super-rendered, I think it would undermine the story we're trying to tell", said Hicks. When designing the character Angel Knives for the comic's second issue, Hicks was inspired by the style of the characters from the Mortal Kombat series.

The first issue of the comic was published on April 3, 2013, and a reprint became available on May 29; the second issue was also published on May 29, followed by the third issue on June 26, and the fourth issue on July 31. All four issues were republished in a collected edition as a single package on October 30, 2013. The comics were republished with new cover art by David Blatt in the Firefly Edition of The Last of Us Part I on September 2, 2022.

Plot 
At the Boston quarantine zone, Ellie becomes caught in a fight with a group of boys who attempt to steal her belongings. Riley Abel steps in to break up the fight, beating one of the boys and making the others flee. Ellie becomes angered by this, claiming that she can take care of herself. Riley then advises Ellie to flee, but the latter is caught and assigned to cleaning duty. While she is completing the chore, she realizes that Riley stole her Walkman, and later demands that she return it, which Riley reluctantly does.

At night, Ellie catches Riley attempting to sneak out of the school, and demands to accompany her. Riley reluctantly agrees, and the two make their way to the mall, where they meet Riley's friend Winston. As Winston teaches Ellie how to ride a horse, Riley steals his radio, and discovers that an attack by the Fireflies—a rebel group opposing the quarantine zone authorities—has occurred nearby. Ellie and Riley make their way to the attack, and find that the Fireflies are wounded and outnumbered. To help, Ellie and Riley throw smoke grenades at the military, allowing the Fireflies to retreat safely. They are spotted by the military, and escape into a nearby alley, where they narrowly avoid being bitten by an Infected—zombie-like creatures infected by a mutated strain of the Cordyceps fungus.

The girls are soon captured by Fireflies, who restrain them; Marlene, the leader of the Fireflies, recognizes Ellie, and demands that she remain safe. When Riley claims she would like to join their group, Marlene refuses, and the two argue, resulting in Marlene threatening to shoot Riley. Ellie intervenes, demanding at gunpoint that Marlene explain how she knows information about Ellie. When Ellie finally lowers the gun, Marlene informs her that she knew Ellie's mother, and had promised her that she would take care of Ellie. Ellie hands the gun to Marlene, who says that she would tell her more about her mother in the future, before telling the girls to leave. When Ellie and Riley reenter the quarantine zone, Riley says that there is no escape. Ellie suggests running away, but Riley informs her that this will just result in death. The two then walk back into the school.

Reception 

The Last of Us: American Dreams received generally positive reviews. Praise was particularly directed at the story and artwork of the comic, which were said to complement each other. The comic was also a commercial success; the first issue sold out, and the resulting high demand led to Dark Horse reissuing the installment.

The comic's story received positive reactions. Lonnie Nadler of Bloody Disgusting felt unsure about the story in the first two issues due to their dedication to character development, but praised the final issue for delivering "authentic drama and raw intensity" which was missing from previous issues. IGN's Jesse Schedeen felt that the story served to enhance the world and characters, and later praised the comic's availability to readers who had not played the game. Conversely, Nathan Butler of Invisible Gamer felt that the introduction and development of the first two issues could have been shortened, and that the final issue attempted to include too much content, ultimately calling the comic a "sub-par attempt at a video game tie-in series".

Reviewers also praised the comic's artwork. Alasdair Stuart of SciFiNow wrote that the art was "so expressive and relaxed", naming Hicks "one of the best artists of her generation". Jen Bosier of Forbes felt that the art style worked well within the context of the story, and IGN's Schedeen felt that the comic heavily relied on the artwork, and that its art style gave it a unique "style and identity". Nadler of Bloody Disgusting called it "quite simplistic, but very clean", and "visually expressive when it matters", comparing it to Scott Pilgrim. Nadler also praised the choice of color, stating that it contained "the right palette of dark and murkey hues", as well as the cover artwork, calling it "consistently stunning". Jennifer Cheng of Comic Book Resources also wrote that the colors fit with the setting of the comic. Peter Jubinsky of Geeks of Doom particularly praised Hicks' depiction of the Infected as "in pain and desperate", calling this "especially harrowing".

References

Notes

Issues

External links 

Dark Horse Comics titles
2013 comics debuts
2013 comics endings
Comics based on video games
Horror comics
Post-apocalyptic comics
Zombies in comics
The Last of Us
Works based on Sony Interactive Entertainment video games